Pillar of Fire is a 30-minute dramatic ballet choreographed by Antony Tudor to Arnold Schoenberg's Verklärte Nacht (Transfigured Night), Op. 4.

Performance history
The work was first produced by Ballet Theatre (now the American Ballet Theatre) at the Metropolitan Opera House on 8 April 1942. The opening-night cast included Nora Kaye as Hagar, Antony Tudor as the Young man, Hugh Laing as the Man in the house across the way, Lucia Chase as the Eldest Sister, Annabelle Lyon as the Youngest Sister, Maria Karnilova, Charles Dickson, Jan Davidson, John Kriza, Virginia Wilcox, Wallace Seibert, Jean Hunt, Barbara Fallis, Sono Osato, Rosella Hightower, Muriel Bentley, Jerome Robbins, Donald Saddler, Frank Hobi, Balina Razoumova, and Roszika Sabo.

Synopsis
American Ballet Theatre describes it in full extensive detail in its archives. The setting is a small country town in 1900 (perhaps in Schoenberg's Austria). Hagar, the middle of three sisters, whose elder sister is a spinster, foresees the same fate for herself. Hagar is surrounded on the one side by the prude and judging neighboring women of the small town, and on the other by licentious men and their hedonistic women. The man she unrequitedly loves seems to show preference for her flirtatious younger sister.

Hagar in desperation gives herself sexually to one of the licentious men, whom she definitely does not love, and who then immediately leaves her abandoned. Afterwards she is shunned by the prude and judging women and is totally distraught by what she has done. This resulting crisis, however, unites her with the one she really loves - the man she loves comes to her, and they dance together rapturously.

The ballet is set in the period around 1900 because it was then that Schoenberg composed its music Verklärte Nacht ("Transfigured Night"). The story plot is based on several traditional text versions - in some versions Hagar becomes pregnant before her true love finally comes to her.

An actual performance
An actual American Ballet Theatre performance, together with spoken brief remarks by Anthony Tudor, is available on YouTube.

Legacy 
This ballet was documented in Labanotation by the Dance Notation Bureau in 1982.

References
Notes

Sources
 Naughtin, Matthew (2014). Ballet Music. Lanham: Rowman & Littlefield. 

Ballets by Antony Tudor
Ballets to the music of Arnold Schoenberg
1942 ballet premieres